Mirajul Islam is a Bangladeshi footballer who plays as a Striker for BFF Elite Academy in the Bangladesh Championship League.

Early life
Mirajul Islam Miraj was born on 1 October 2006, in Jhalokati District of the Barisal Division, the son of Henara Begum and Khalilur Rahman. His father, worked at a restaurant before retiring due to sickness. His parents were initially against the idea of him pursuing football, and often prevented Miraj from playing by tying him to beds in their house. Due to his family's persistence, Miraj had to hide his football boots at a friends house, who he would often visit and later stay with. In 2017, he survived the initial stage of Bangladesh Krira Shikkha Protishtan (BKSP) football trails held in Jhalokati, and was taken to Savar for the final selection stage. He impressed in the final selection round and was admitted to the Barishal branch of BKSP as a sixth grade student. He travelled to India with BKSP for the 2018 Subroto Cup, and struck 7 goals for his team. With the Barishal divisional team, he participated in the Bangabandhu U-17 Football Tournament in 2020, and was part of the team that defeated Chittagong Division 2–1 in the much anticipated final, with the presence of Prime Minister Sheikh Hasina. While playing regional tournaments with BKSP in Barishal, academy coach Anwar Hossain secured Miraj a deal with the 2017 Pioneer Football League champions Kingstar Sporting Club, in 2020.

Club career

Kingstar Sporting Club
After the 2019–20 Dhaka Third Division League was postponed due to the COVID-19 outbreak while the season opening game against Chawkbazar United ended in their opponents forfeiting, Miraj officially made his debut for Kingstar and scored in a 2–0 victory over Alamgir Shomaj Kollayan KS, on 2 March 2021. Miraj scored his first domestic league goal while still being of only 14 years and 5 months. He scored a hat-trick against Asaduzzaman Football Academy in a 4–2 victory, on 5 March 2021. Miraj scored 6 goals in 8 games, as his team qualified for the Super League round as undefeated group winners.

In the Super League, Miraj scored his first goal in a 2–0 victory over Dipali Jubo Shangha, on 30 June 2021. He went on to score 3 more goals and a total of 4 goals in 9 games, as his club earned promotion to the Dhaka Second Division League, as unbeaten runners-up. Miraj's goal against Narinda Junior Lions Club in the season ending game on 9 September 2021, was his last goal for the club. He finished the season with 10 goals from 17 games. While playing for the Kingstar he participated in the nationwide trials held by the Bangladesh Football Federation (BFF) for the newly launched BFF Elite Football Academy. He survived the trials and was selected for the main team that would eventually play second-tier football, the Bangladesh Championship League, the following year.

BFF Elite Academy

2021–22 season: Breakthrough and Mohammedan SC
On 20 February 2022, Mirajul entered professional football by scoring a brace, as BFF Elite Academy defeated NoFeL SC 2–1. This was the academies first league game and thus, Miraj became their first ever goalscorer, this attracted the attention of newly appointed national team head coach Javier Cabrera. He was selected for the preliminary Bangladesh U23 squad for the eventually postponed 2022 Asian Games, after only playing a single game in the second-tier. By the fifth matchday of the league season, the Elite Academy team had scored 6 goals, all of which scored by Miraj. Expressing his desire to play international football, Miraj stated in an interview "I don't know if I can play in the Asian Games. However, I have dreamed of playing in the national team since childhood."

On 10 March 2022, he was called up to the Bangladesh national team camp, to train with the team. Miraj scored a hat-trick against Uttara FC in a 5–2 victory, increasing his goal tally to 10 in 10 games. During the April mid-season transfer window, Miraj attracted interest from numerous clubs Bangladesh Premier League clubs and eventually joined Mohammedan SC on a loan deal with a transfer fee of Tk 10 lakh, thus, becoming the first Elite Academy player to join a top-tier club. 40 percent of the transfer fee was given to Miraj, and along with BFF's assistance he was able to pay for his mother, Henara Begum's treatment, as she was terminally ill with Cancer.

On 25 April 2022, Miraj made his Premier League debut against Sheikh Russel KC, coming on as a substitute in the 46th minute of the game. Mohammedan SC coach Sean Lane deployed him as a left-winger, until he was taken off by the 81st minute. He went on to make a couple of more appearances as a substitute, before Lane was replaced by Shafiqul Islam Manik at the dugout. Other than being an unused substitute against Bashundhara Kings on 2 July 2022, he was left out of the squad for the reminder of the season, ending his loan spell at the club with only 98 minutes of game time.

2022–23 season: Top scorer
Miraj returned to the Elite Academy after his loan spell with Mohammedan SC ended. On 20 November 2022, Miraj scored against Police FC in a 1–1 draw, when his side were invited to take part in the 2022–23 Independence Cup. On 6 January 2023, he scored a hat-trick against Uttara FC in a  3–1, during the opening game of the 2022–23 Bangladesh Championship League. On 28 January 2023, he scored his second hat-trick of the season, in a 3–0 victory over Little Friends Club, with his second goal being a stunning bicycle kick. By the end of the first phase of the league he scored 15 goals in 11 games.

International career

Youth
In July 2022, Miarj was selected for the Bangladesh U20 team by coach Paul Smalley for the then upcoming 2022 SAFF U-20 Championship, in Bhubaneswar, India. As most players in the team were from top-tier Bangladeshi clubs, Miraj would have to start the tournament as a substitute against Sri Lanka U20, and scored from a curling effort on the 71st minute, to win his side the game. However, his goal was not enough to earn him a place in the starting XI against India U20, as he was an unused substitute in a 2–1 victory. On 29 July 2022, he started the third group game against Maldives U20 and scored scored a first-half hat-trick as his side won the game 4–1. Miarj's performances heaped praise from coach Pual Smalley, with the Englishman stating "He’s a talented player, a player who needs a little bit of guidance. He works very hard and I’m very pleased for him. During the first half, he scored some wonderful goals and created some chances for other players. His application I thought was extremely good." Miraj's last appearance in the tournament was as a second-half substitute in the final, as Bangladesh would succumb to a 2–5 defeat.	

In September 2022, Miraj was called up to the Bangladesh U17 for the 2022 SAFF U-17 Championship, held in Colombo, Sri Lanka. The team was coached by Rashed Ahmed Pappu, who was also the head coach of the BFF Elite Academy, and included only Elite Academy players. Although Bangladesh defeated hosts Sri Lanka U17 5–0, Miraj was not able to put his name on the scoresheet, he responded in the following group-stage game, with a hat-trick against Malidives U17 in a 5–1 win, on 7 September 2022. On 12 September 2022, Miraj scored against India U17, in the semi-final, he dribbled past two defenders before being fouled and earned a penalty, which he later converted. However, Bangladesh crashed out of the tournament with a 1–2 defeat. Nonetheless, Miraj's performances during the 2023 AFC U-17 Asian Cup qualifiers was disappointing, as hosts Bangladesh were unable to qualify for the main tournament after being thrashed 4–0 by Yeman U17.

Personal life
Miraj is the youngest among three brothers and was brought up in his fathers rented house in Jhalokati municipality area. His eldest brother works in the Bangladesh Army while the middle one worked as a Auto rickshaw driver. According to Miraj his brothers played an integral role in convincing his parents to let him pursue football as a career and his eventual admission into Bangladesh Krira Shikkha Protishtan (BKSP), where Miraj would also be able to complete his education.

Career statistics

Club

International goals

Youth
Scores and results list Bangladesh's goal tally first.

Honours

Individual
 SAFF U-17 Championship top scorer: 2022

References

External links
 Mirajul Islam at soccerway.com

Living people
2006 births
People from Jhalokati district
Association football forwards
Mohammedan SC (Dhaka) players
Bangladesh Football Premier League players
Bangladeshi footballers
Bangladesh youth international footballers